Gaziantep Castle is a castle on top of a mound in the centre of Gaziantep, Turkey. First used as an observation point during the Hittite Empire, it was expanded into a castle during Roman rule. The castle was severely damaged by earthquakes in February 2023.

History 
The hilltop was first used as an observation point by the Hittite Empire. It was later expanded into a main castle by the Roman Empire in the 2nd and 3rd centuries AD. It underwent further expansion and renovation under Byzantine Emperor Justinian I between AD 527 and 565. The walls are built of stone and the castle has 12 bastions.

The castle has been renovated numerous times. It saw changes made during the reign of the Ayyubids in the 12th and 13th centuries, as well as the Ottoman Empire, and played an important role during the Turkish War of Independence of the early 20th century.

It is used as the Gaziantep Defence and Heroism Panoramic Museum, and a documentary regarding the defence of the city against the French forces after the fall of the Ottoman Empire runs periodically.

On 6 February 2023, the castle was severely damaged by two consecutive earthquakes. Some of the eastern and southern bastions collapsed, and iron railings and walls around the castle were seriously damaged.

Gallery

References 

Castles in Turkey
Buildings and structures in Gaziantep
Tourist attractions in Gaziantep Province
Ruined castles in Turkey
Buildings damaged by the 2023 Turkey–Syria earthquake